Mones Quintela is a small town in the Artigas Department of northern Uruguay.

Geography
It is connected to the Route 3 by a local road.

Origin of name and history
The town takes its name from Alfredo Mones Quintela, an agricultural engineer, once a director of the National Federation of Agricultural Cooperative in the 1950s. The CALPICA sugar plant supported the vast majority of the population for a few decades, and was converted into a cooperative irrigation for vegetable and fruit crops and industrial plant is now used as a deposit for rice.

On 5 and 6 November 2010, Mones Quintela held the first festival of sugarcane in Uruguay and commemorated the 25th anniversary of the denomination of Mones Quintela as a town.

Population
In 2011 Mones Quintela had a population of 531.
 
Source: Instituto Nacional de Estadística de Uruguay

References

External links
INE map of Mones Quintela

Populated places in the Artigas Department